Dolce Fine Giornata is a 2019 Polish drama film directed by Jacek Borcuch. It was screened in the World Cinema Dramatic Competition section at the 2019 Sundance Film Festival.

Cast
 Krystyna Janda as Maria Linde
 Kasia Smutniak as Anna
 Vincent Riotta as Commissar  Lodovici
 Antonio Catania as Antonio
 Robin Renucci as "Le Monde" Journalist
 Lorenzo de Moor as Nazeer
 Miła Borcuch as Elena
 Arjun Talwar as Mina

References

External links
 

2019 films
2019 drama films
Polish drama films
2010s Polish-language films